William Ernest Wattison (5 November 1903 – 13 November 1975) was an Australian politician and a member of the New South Wales Legislative Assembly from 1947 until 1968. He was a member of the Labor Party (ALP).

Early life 

Wattison was born in Broken Hill, New South Wales and was the son of a miner. He was educated at Burke Ward Public School in Broken Hill and worked for the Barrier Daily Truth while still young. Later he worked as a miner and was active in the local union movement, including serving on the Barrier Industrial Council for 15 years. He was involved in the Broken Hill Unemployed Union in the Great Depression in the early 1930s and served as the assistant secretary of the Workers Industrial Union of Australia (WIUA), the local miners' union. He was involved with local organizations including the Broken Hill Hospital Board and the Royal Far West Children's Health Scheme.

Parliamentary career 

Wattison was elected to the parliament as the Labor member for Sturt at the 1947 election having won preselection against the sitting Labor member Ted Horsington in December 1946. He had contested the preselection ballots of the Barrier District Association of the Australian Labor Party (BDAALP) for Sturt since the early 1930s. Wattison's preselection reflected a general shift to the right in the local labour movement, and away from earlier, more radical political leaders.  Wattison was Broken Hill's first MLA to have been born in the town. Wattison retained the seat for the Labor Party at the next 6 elections and retired from public life at the 1968 election. He sat on the central executive of the ALP from 1954 to 1957.

References

1903 births
1972 deaths
Members of the New South Wales Legislative Assembly
Australian Labor Party members of the Parliament of New South Wales
20th-century Australian politicians